The 2010 Moscow Victory Day Parade was held on 9 May 2010 to commemorate the 65th anniversary of the capitulation of Nazi Germany in 1945. The parade marks the Soviet Union's victory in the Great Patriotic War.

It was the largest parade held in Moscow, Russia since the Soviet Union's dissolution in 1991, and saw 11,135 troops, 127 aircraft and helicopters, and the new Topol-M mobile intercontinental ballistic missile taking part. For the first time, the 2010 parade on Red Square also included military units from foreign countries who were allied with the Soviet Union during World War II, with representation from France, Poland, the United Kingdom, the United States and members of the Commonwealth of Independent States.

Military components 

The 9 May Victory Day Parade in Moscow involved more than 10,000 troops marching, 160 military vehicles and 127 military aircraft, making it the largest parade to be held since the dissolution of the Soviet Union in 1991.

Twenty aviation units of the Russian Air Force took part in the parade, which saw the Ilyushin Il-76, Ilyushin Il-78, Antonov An-124, Sukhoi Su-27, Ilyushin Il-80, Beriev A-50, Tupolev Tu-22M, Sukhoi Su-25, Mikoyan MiG-29, Mikoyan MiG-31, Tupolev Tu-95 and Tupolev Tu-160 performing flypasts. Also taking part for the first time were the Yakovlev Yak-130 jet trainer aircraft and the Mil Mi-26 heavy helicopter. The mobile ICBM Topol-M missile, that first appeared at the 2009 parade, was shown here again for the second consecutive year.

Foreign military 

The 2010 Parade marked the first time that foreign and Commonwealth of Independent States (CIS) soldiers joined Russian forces on Red Square for the parade. Battalions from the CIS included Armenia, Azerbaijan, Belarus, Kazakhstan, Kyrgyzstan, Moldova, Tajikistan and Ukraine among them. Upon request from the government of Turkmenistan, the contingent from Turkmenistan was led by an officer riding on horseback, with the horse (which was a descendant of the horse used during the 1945 parade) being flown into Moscow from Ashgabat. Poland was represented by the Representative Battalion of the Polish Armed Forces. The United Kingdom was represented by a detachment of 76 soldiers from Number 2 Company, 1st Battalion, Welsh Guards, the Central Band of the Royal Air Force and the Band of the Royal Air Force Regiment. The United States was represented by the 2nd Battalion of the 18th Infantry Regiment and the Naval Forces Europe Band. France was represented by pilots and aircraft from the Normandie-Niemen Air Regiment. The combined Russian and foreign massed bands performed Slavsya, Ode to Joy and Den Pobedy at the conclusion of the parade. Russian President Dmitry Medvedev called the inclusion of foreign troops in the parade recognition of their "common victory" in World War II.

The inclusion of foreign troops in the parade was not without controversy. The Communist Party of the Russian Federation held a May Day rally in Moscow, at which several thousand protesters used the rally to decry the inclusion of troops from NATO countries in the parade. A poll run by the Levada Center saw 20 percent of respondents disapproving of the presence of foreign troops, with 8 percent being strongly opposed.

International dignitaries 

Mihai Ghimpu, the Acting President of Moldova, stated in late April 2010, after previously accepting an invitation from Russian President Dmitry Medvedev to attend the celebrations, that he would not be attending, claiming "I have no ties with Moscow. Only the victorious are going, what will the defeated do there?" Concerns also arose that a Moldovan contingent would not be able to attend the parade because of financial difficulties in the country, but a Moldovan government source told Kommersant that this was only an excuse, and Ghimpu was choosing to improve Moldova's relations with Romania, which was not invited to attend the celebrations as it was an ally of Germany during World War II. Russian Foreign Minister Sergey Lavrov responded to remarks by Ghimpu, which also included the opinion that Russia should pay Moldova compensation for what he claimed was a "Soviet occupation", by urging Moldovan authorities not to use the occasion for political speculation. King Michael of Romania, the last head of state alive from World War II, was invited by Russian president Medvedev to attend the ceremony.

German Chancellor Angela Merkel confirmed her attendance on 30 April, as did Acting President of Poland Bronisław Komorowski. Komorowski's attendance is said to be part of an effort to bolster Poland–Russia relations, which improved after the death of Polish President Lech Kaczyński in a plane crash near Smolensk in early April 2010. Kaczyński is said to have confirmed his attendance at the parade shortly prior to the crash in which he was killed, with reports in the week prior to his death showing that he was questioning his attendance.

Chinese President Hu Jintao confirmed his attendance at the parade on 3 May. The following day Slovak President Ivan Gašparovič's attendance was confirmed. Other world leaders who confirmed their attendance included Czech President Václav Klaus, French President Nicolas Sarkozy, Italian Prime Minister Silvio Berlusconi, Serbian President Boris Tadić, Bulgarian President Georgi Parvanov, and Vietnamese President Nguyễn Minh Triết, Leaders from Armenia, Azerbaijan, Estonia, Greece, Israel, Kazakhstan, Latvia, Mongolia and Slovenia also confirmed their attendance. On 8 May Sarkozy and Berlusconi announced that they wouldn't be attending the parade in Moscow, so that they could tackle the European sovereign debt crisis.

Both the United Kingdom and the United States had planned to send high-profile representatives. Gordon Brown, the Prime Minister of the United Kingdom, was invited to Russia, but because of the UK general election he was unable to attend; the Foreign and Commonwealth Office suggested the Prince of Wales (now Charles III), instead. Barack Obama, the President of the United States, was also unable to attend, but offered Vice President Joe Biden as the US representative; Biden was in Brussels as part of US efforts to improve relations with the European Union. According to The Guardian, both figures were rejected by Russian Prime Minister Vladimir Putin, however, in what both countries perceived as a diplomatic snub. This was put down to poor British relations with Russia over the UK's continuing refusal to extradite Boris Berezovsky over Russian charges of embezzlement, and because of Biden's close relations with Georgian President Mikheil Saakashvili, who is widely unpopular in Russia because of the 2008 Russia–Georgia War. The UK and US were instead represented by their ambassadors to Russia, Dame Anne Pringle and John Beyrle respectively.

The list of heads of foreign states, governments and international organisations that attended the parade were:

The parade 

At 10:00am (MSK), the clock of Spasskaya Tower in the Moscow Kremlin rang and signalled the beginning of the parade commemorating the defeat of Nazi Germany by the Union of Soviet Socialist Republics in the Great Patriotic War. The event then began with the display of the flag of Russia and the Victory Banner. After this, commander of the Moscow Military District Colonel General Valery Gerasimov, who commanded the parade, and Anatoly Serdyukov, the Russian Minister of Defence, who inspected the parade, joined and inspected the troops. At 10:14am, Serdyukov reported to Supreme Commander-in-Chief, and Russian President, Dmitry Medvedev on the readiness of the troops.

After this President Medvedev made a speech in which he stated, "Sixty-five years ago Nazism was vanquished. The machine that was wiping out whole nations was stopped. Peace returned to our country and to Europe as a whole. An end was put to the ideology that was destroying the fundamentals of civilisation." Medvedev also emphasised the role the Soviet Union played in the war, bearing the brunt of Nazi attacks, in which some three-quarters of their military forces participated.

After his speech and the playing of the National Anthem of the Russian Federation, a parade of troops took place on Red Square, led by the Drummers' Company of the Moscow Military Conservatoire, Military University of the MDRF. Some 10,500 thousand troops marched, and approximately 1,000 troops from the Commonwealth of Independent States, Poland, the United Kingdom, France and the United States also marched. This was followed by a procession of 161 pieces of military hardware through Red Square, and 127 aircraft and helicopters making a flypast over the Kremlin to form the number "65".

The historical part of the parade began with the entry onto Red Square of infantry, air force and navy representatives in uniforms resplendent of the Great Patriotic War. Behind them troops from Armenia, Azerbaijan, Belarus, Kazakhstan, Kyrgyzstan, Moldova, Tajikistan and Ukraine marched. Each of these nations of the Commonwealth of Independent States were represented by some 70 troops. Following the participants from the CIS, was a guard of honour from the Polish Army, and they were followed by 71 members of the British Army, 76 members of the United States military, and 68 members of the French military. At the rear of the foreign segment of the parade were 68 troops from Turkmenistan, led by a commander riding on horseback, of which the horse has blood-lines to the horse lent to Marshal Georgy Zhukov by Stalin for the original parade. It was followed by the Presidential Regiment Cavalry Escort Squadron, wearing GPW uniforms of the Soviet Cavalry forces.

Parade Participants 
Note: Those indicated in bold indicate first parade appearance, those indicated with italic indicate double or multiple parade appearances.
 Colonel General Valery Gerasimov, Commander of the Moscow Military District (parade commander)
 Defense Minister of the Russian Federation Anatoliy Serdyukov (parade inspector)

Military Bands in Attendance 
 Massed Military Bands led and conducted by Major General Valery Khalilov and composed of:
 Headquarters Band of the Moscow Military District under Lt. Col. V Shevernev
 Central Military Band of the MDRF under Col. Andrei Kolotushkin and Drum Major of the Central Band Lt. Col. Sergey Durygin
 Headquarters Band, of the Ministry of Internal Affairs of the Russian Federation
 Central Band of the Russian Navy
 Band of the Moscow Military Conservatoire, Military University of the Ministry of Defense of the Russian Federation
 HQ Band of the Ministry of Emergency Situations of the Russian Federation
 Band of the Combined Arms Academy of the Armed Forces of the Russian Federation
 Band of the Military Technological University
 Band of the Peter the Great Military Academy of the Rocket Forces of Strategic Importance
 Central Band of the Royal Air Force
 The Band of the Royal Air Force Regiment
 United States Navy Naval Forces Europe Band
 Wind and Fanfare Band of the French Army Ile-de-France Military Region
 Band of the 5th Tamanskaya Guards Ind. Motor Rifle Brigade "Mikhail Kalinin"
 Band of the 4th Kantemir Guards Armored Brigade "Yuri Andropov"
 Band of the 27th Sevastopol Guards Motor Rifle Brigade
 Central Band of the Russian Air Force
 Band of the Gagarin-Zhukovsky Combined Air Force Academy
 Headquarters Band of the Russian Airborne Troops
 Band of the Ryazan Airborne Command Academy
 Headquarters Band of the Federal Security Service
 Band of the MES Civil Defense Academy
 Moscow Combined Band of the Ministry of Internal Affairs
 Drummers Company, Moscow Military Conservatoire, Military University of the Ministry of Defense of the Russian Federation

Ground Column 
 154th Moscow Garrison Commandant's Honor Guard Regiment and Color Guards
 Colors Party composed of:
 Flag of Russia
 Victory Banner
 Banner of the Armed Forces of the Russian Federation
 Combined Honor Guards Company of the Armed Forces
 Historical troops and colors
 Front Standard bearers
 Historical Colors Party
 Historical troops of the Soviet Armed Forces
 Red Army
 Soviet Air Forces
 Soviet Navy
 WPRA Army Cavalry Corps and Cavalry Mechanized Groups Command (represented by the Cavalry Escort Squadron of the Presidential Regiment)
 Forces of the Commonwealth of Independent States and Allied nations
 Azerbaijani peacekeeping forces
 Yerevan Capital Regiment, Armed Forces of Armenia
 5th Spetsnaz Brigade of the Armed Forces of Belarus
 Honor Guard Company of the Ministry of Defense of Kazakhstan
 8th Guards Motor Rifle Division of the Armed Forces of Kyrgyzstan
 Honor Guard Company of the Moldovan National Army
 Military Institute of the Ministry of Defense of Tajikistan
 Ukrainian Ground Forces Military Academy
 Representative Honor Guard Battalion of the Polish Armed Forces
 2nd Coy. 1st Battalion, Welsh Guards, British Army
 18th Infantry Regiment, United States Army
 Normandie-Niemen Air Regiment, French Air Force
 Independent Honor Guard Battalion of the Ministry of Defence of Turkmenistan
 Armed Forces of the Russian Federation, Ministry of Internal Affairs of the Russian Federation, Ministry of Emergency Situations and Civil Defense of the Russian Federation, Federal Security Service of the Russian Federation
 Combined Arms Academy of the Armed Forces of the Russian Federation
 Military University of the Ministry of Defense of the Russian Federation
 Gagarin-Zhukovsky Combined Air Force Academy
 Air Force Gen. Staff School of Rocket Forces and Anti-Air Defense Training
 Baltic Naval Military Institute "Admiral Fyodor Ushakov"
 336th Separate Bialystok Guards Naval Infantry Brigade of the Baltic Fleet
 Peter the Great Military Academy of the Strategic Missile Forces
 Moscow Military Rocket Forces Institute, SRFI RF
 Military Space Academy
 Moscow Military Space Institute of Radio Electronics
 Ryazan Airborne Command Academy "Gen. of the Army Vasily Margelov"
 331st Guards Airborne Regiment
 Moscow Border Service Institute of the Federal Security Service
 OMSDON 1st Internal Troops Division of the Ministry of Internal Affairs of the Russian Federation "Felix Dzenzhinsky"
 Civil Defense Academy of the Ministry of Emergency Situations of the Russian Federation
 Military Technological University
 5th Tamanskaya Guards Ind. Motor Rifle Brigade "Mikhail Kalinin"
 27th Sevastopol Guards Motor Rifle Brigade
 Moscow Military Commanders Training School "Supreme Soviet of the RSFSR/Russian Federation"

Mobile Column 
 T-34
 GAZ-67B
 SU-100
 GAZ-2975
 BPM-97
 BTR-80
 BMP-3
 T-90
 2S19 Msta
 Buk missile system
 TOS-1
 BM-30 Smerch
 S-400 Triumf
 Pantsir-S1
 Iskander-M
 Topol-M

Air Column Flypast 

 Mi-8 Colors Party
 Mi-24
 Mi-28
 Mil Mi-35
 Yak-130
 MiG-29
 Sukhoi Su-24
 Sukhoi Su-34
 Sukhoi Su-27
 Tu-22M3
 Tu-95
 Tu-160
 Joint formation squadron of Russian Knights and Strizhi (Sukhoi Su-27 and Mikoyan MiG-29)
 Il-78
 Beriev A-50
 Sukhoi Su-25
 Antonov An-124

Music 

 Flag procession, Inspection, and Address
 Sacred War (Священная Война) by Alexandr Alexandrov
 Slow March of the Tankmen (Встречный Марш Танкистов) by Semyon Tchernetsky
 Slow March to Carry the War Flag (Встречный Марш для выноса Боевого Знамени) by Dmitriy Valentinovich Kadeyev
 Slow March of the Guards of the Navy (Гвардейский Встречный Марш Военно-Морского Флота) by Nikolai Pavlocich Ivanov-Radkevich
 Slow March of the Officers Schools (Встречный Марш офицерских училищ) by Semyon Tchernetsky
 Slow March (Встречный Марш) by Dmitry Pertsev
 Slow March of the Red Army (Встречный Марш Красной Армии) by Semyon Tchernetsky
 Slow March (Встречный Марш) by Evgeny Aksyonov
 March of the Preobrazhensky Regiment (Марш Преображенского Полка)
 Parade Fanfare All Listen! (Парадная Фанфара "Слушайте все!”) by Andrei Golovin
 State Anthem of the Russian Federation (Государственный Гимн Российской Федерации) by Alexander Alexandrov
 Signal Retreat (Сигнал "Отбой")

 Infantry Column
 Triumph of the Winners (Триумф Победителей)
 Ballad of a Soldier (Баллада о Солдате) by Vasily Pavlovich Solovyov-Sedoy
 March of the Defenders of Moscow (Марш защи́тников Москвы́) by Boris Alexandrovich Mokroysov
 March Hero (Марш "Герой")
 On Guard for the Peace (На страже Мира) by Boris Alexandrovich Diev
 Air March (Авиамарш) by Yuliy Abramovich Khait
 Crew is One Family (Экипаж - одна семья) by Viktor Vasilyevich Pleshak
 March of the Cosmonauts/Friends, I believe (Марш Космонавтов /Я верю, друзья) by Oskar Borisovich Feltsman
 We Need One Victory (Нам Нужна Одна Победа) by Bulat Shalvovich Okudzhava
 To Serve Russia (Служить России) by Eduard Cemyonovich Khanok
 Victory Day (День Победы) by David Fyodorovich Tukhmanov

 Vehicle Column
 March General Miloradovich (Марш "Генерал Милорадович") by Valery Khalilov
 March Hero (Марш "Герой")
 Katyusha (Катюша) by Matvey Blanter
 March Kant (Марш "Кант") by Valery Khalilov
 March of the Tankmen (Марш Танкистов) by Semyon Tchernetsky
 March Hero (Марш "Герой") by Unknown
 Katyusha (Катюша) by Matvey Blanter
 March Kant (Марш "Кант") by Valery Khalilov
 March of the Tankmen (Марш Танкистов) by Semyon Tchernetsky

 Flypast Column
 Air March (Авиамарш) by Yuliy Abramovich Khait
 March Airplanes – First of all (Марш "Первым делом самолёты") by Vasili-Solovyov-Sedoi
 It’s time to go (Пора в путь-дорогу) by Vasili-Solovyov-Sedoi
 Air March (Авиамарш) by Yuliy Abramovich Khait
 March Airplanes – First of all (Марш "Первым делом самолёты") by Vasili-Solovyov-Sedoi

 Conclusion
 Glory (Славься) by Mikhail Glinka
 Ode to Joy by Ludwig van Beethoven
 Victory Day (День Победы) by David Fyodorovich Tukhmanov
 Farewell of Slavianka (Прощание Славянки) by Vasiliy Agapkin

Gallery

See also 

 2010 Minsk Victory Day Parade
 2010 Kyiv Victory Day Parade
 Moscow Victory Parade of 1945
 Victory Day (9 May)
 Victory Day Parades

References

External links 

  Organising committee for the 65th anniversary celebrations of victory in the Great Patriotic War
  Full video of the parade at Kremlin.ru

Photos and videos 
 360° panoramas of the parade in QuickTime VR technology
 Moscow Victory Day Parade Rehearsal of US Army for Red Square
 British soldiers march on Red Square on historic parade
 Французы готовятся к параду в Москве

Moscow Victory Day Parades
Moscow Victory Day Parade
Articles containing video clips
2010 in military history
2010 in Moscow
May 2010 events in Russia